Bad Magick: The Best of Shooter Jennings and the .357's is the first compilation album released by Shooter Jennings. It was released March 24, 2009 via Universal South Records. The album includes tracks from his first three studio albums — 2005's Put the "O" Back in Country, 2006's Electric Rodeo and 2007's The Wolf. Also included is the live recording of "Daddy's Farm". "Living Proof" is a cover of Hank Williams, Jr.'s 1976 single, and is new to this album. The album also includes a cover of Lonesome On'ry and Mean, a song which was covered in 1973 by Waylon Jennings.

Track listing

Chart performance

References

[ Bad Magick] at Allmusic

2009 greatest hits albums
Shooter Jennings albums
Albums produced by Dave Cobb
Show Dog-Universal Music compilation albums